Asrar ul Hassan Khan (1 October 1919 − 24 May 2000), better known as Majrooh Sultanpuri, was an Indian Urdu poet and lyricist in India's Hindi language film industry. He wrote Hindustani lyrics for numerous Hindi film soundtracks.

He was one of the dominating musical forces in Indian cinema in the 1950s and early 1960s, and was an important figure in the Progressive Writers' Movement. He is considered one of the finest avant-garde Urdu poets of 20th century literature.

In his career spanning six decades, he worked with many music directors. He won the Filmfare Best Lyricist Award in 1965 for "Chahunga Main Tujhe" in the film Dosti, and the highest award in Indian cinema, the Dadasaheb Phalke Award for lifetime achievement in 1993. In the 1980s and 1990s, most of his work was with Anand–Milind, their most notable collaborations being Qayamat Se Qayamat Tak, Lal Dupatta Malmal Ka, Love, Kurbaan and Dahek.

He also wrote timeless classics with Jatin-Lalit for films like Jo Jeeta Wohi Sikander (including the song “Pehla Nasha”) and their debut film Yaara Dildara (including the song “Bin Tere Sanam”), which are both often heard to this day on the Indian musical airwaves.

Early life
Majrooh Sultanpuri was born as Asrar ul Hassan Khan in a Rajput Muslim family, in Sultanpur, Uttar Pradesh, where his father was posted in the Police Department in 1919/1920. His father, though, a police officer, was not too keen on his son receiving English education and Majrooh was therefore sent for traditional 'Madrasa education' which led to his obtaining the qualification first of Dars-e-Nizami –  a seven-year course which concentrated on religious affairs along with proficiency in Arabic and Persian- and then the certificate of 'Alim. He thereafter joined Lucknow's Takmeel-ut-Tib College of Unani medicine (Greek System of Medicine). He was a struggling Hakim when he happened to recite one of his ghazals at a mushaira in Sultanpur. The ghazal was a hit with the audience and Majrooh decided to drop his fledgling medical practice and began writing poetry seriously. Soon he was a 'regular' at mushairas and a "shagird" i.e. disciple of the then top name in Urdu Mushairas viz Jigar Moradabadi. While Majrooh is popular as a film lyricist and is widely known in that capacity, be it known that he also created one of the best-known verses of Urdu poetry:

"Main akela hee chala tha janibe manzil magar,
log saath aate gaye aur carvan banta gaya!"
(I set off alone towards the destination but
people joined in and soon it became a caravan!)

Films
In 1945, Majrooh visited Bombay to attend a mushaira at the Saboo Siddique Institute. Here his ghazals and poetry were highly appreciated by the audience. One of the impressed listeners was film producer A.R. Kardar. He contacted Jigar Moradabadi who helped him to meet Majrooh. However, Majrooh refused to write for films because he didn't think very highly of them. But Jigar Moradabadi persuaded him, saying that films would pay well and would help Majrooh to support his family. Kardar then took him to music composer Naushad who put the young writer to test. He gave Majrooh a tune and asked him to write something in the same metre, and Majrooh wrote Jab Usne Gesu Bikhraye, Badal Aaye Jhoom Ke.... Naushad liked what he wrote and Majrooh was signed on as the lyricist of the film Shah Jehan (1946). The songs of the film became so immensely popular that singer K.L. Saigal wanted Jab Dil Hi Toot Gaya to be played at his funeral.

Majrooh subsequently did films like Naatak (1947), Doli (1947) and Anjuman (1948) but his major breakthrough came with Mehboob Khan’s immortal love triangle, Andaz (1949), where he penned hit songs like Tu Kahe Agar, Jhoom Jhoom Ke Naacho Aaj, Hum Aaj Kahin Dil Kho Baithe, Toote Na Dil Toote Na and Uthaye Ja Unke Situm. Another film of his, where his songs proved extremely popular, was the Shaheed Latif directed, Dilip Kumar-Kamini Kaushal starrer, Arzoo (1950). Ae Dil Mujhe Aisi Jagah Le Chal from the film remains one of the finest songs filmed on Dilip Kumar.

He was sentenced to two years imprisonment due to his politically-charged poems in 1949. Having to start his film career afresh, Majrooh finally broke though again with the Guru Dutt films Baaz (1953) and especially, Aar Paar (1954). With such successful songs like Babuji Dheere Chalna, Kabhi Aar Kabhi Paar, Yeh Lo Main Haari Piya and Sun Sun Sun Sun Zaalima among others, Majrooh was back with a bang. Thereafter, he never had to struggle again. Singer Geeta Dutt singled out Yeh Lo Main Haari Piya as among her ten best songs ever in a list she put together in 1957.

The Guru Dutt-Majrooh Sultanpuri-O. P. Nayyar team went even one better with Dutt’s following film, Mr. & Mrs. '55 (1955). The songs are one of the reasons for the success of the film and numbers like Thandi Hawa Kaali Ghata, Udhar Tum Haseen Ho, Jaane Kahan Mera Jigar Gaya Ji and Chal Diye Banda Nawaz were hummed in every nook and corner of the country.

Although Majrooh Sultanpuri worked with all the top music directors of the day – Anil Biswas, Naushad, Madan Mohan, O. P. Nayyar, Roshan, Salil Chowdhury, Chitragupt, N. Datta, Kalyanji-Anandji and Laxmikant-Pyarelal to name some, his associations with S.D. Burman stands out resulting in some outstanding songs.

With S.D. Burman, his work in films like Paying Guest (1957), Nau Do Gyarah (1957), Kala Pani (1958), Solva Saal (1958), Sujata (1959), Bombai Ka Babu (1960) and Jewel Thief (1967) is unforgettable. The list of hit songs he has written is huge as all these films had some extremely finely composed songs set to his writing. Few could match Majrooh and S.D. Burman in light, ‘chhed-chhad’ (playful), romantic songs like Chhod Do Aanchal (Paying Guest), Aankhon Mein Kya Ji (Nau Do Gyarah), Achha Ji Main Haari Chalo Maan Jaao Na (Kala Pani) and Deewana Mastana Hua Dil (Bombai Ka Babu). But in the same films Majrooh showed just how beautifully he could write serious songs such as Chand Phir Nikla (Paying Guest), Hum Bekhudi Mein Tumko Pukare (Kala Pani) and Saathi Na Koi Manzil (Bombai Ka Babu).

With R.D. Burman, though they did countless films together,  his work, particularly, in the frothy Nasir Hussain musicals of the 1960s, ’70s and early ’80s stands out in films like Teesri Manzil (1966) – produced by Hussain and directed by Vijay Anand, Baharon Ke Sapne (1967), Pyar Ka Mausam (1969), Caravan (1971), Yaadon Ki Baaraat (1973), Hum Kisise Kum Naheen (1977) and Zamane Ko Dikhana Hai (1981).

In the year 1964, the partnership of Majrooh Sultanpuri and Laxmikant-Pyarelal started through the film Dosti. Laxmikant–Pyarelal got more out of the veteran Majrooh in Dosti (1964). It was Majrooh’s award-winning lyrics. Majrooh won his only filmfare award. Laxmikant–Pyarelal too won their first Filmfare award for the music of Dosti.

Majrooh Sultanpuri and Laxmikant-Pyarelal worked for nearly 40 films. The Laxmi-Pyare and Majrooh team produced some spectacular, noteworthy albums like Dillagi (1966), Pathar Ke Sanam (1967), Shagird (1967), Mere Hamdam Mere Dost (1968), Dharti Kahe Pukar Ke (1969), Abhinetri (1970), V. Shantaram’s classic, dance-musical, Jal Bin Machhli Nritya Bin Bijli (1971), Ek Nazar (1972), Imtihan (1974) and many more.

Majrooh Sultanpuri's few hit songs with Laxmikant-Pyarelal
'Chahunga Main Tujhe' Dosti 1964, {Ye Aajkal Ke Ladke} Dillagi 1966, "Payal Ki Jhankar" Mere Lal, 1966, "Bade Miyan Deewane" and  "Dil Wil Pyar Wyar" Shagird, 1967. "Hui Shaam Unka", "Chhalkaye Jaam" and "Chalo Sajana" Mere Hamdam Mere Dost, 1968.“Patthar Ke Sanam”, "Mehboob Mere Mehboob Mere", "Tauba Ye Matwali Chal" and "Batadu Kya Lana" all from Patthar Ke Sanam 1968. "Ek Tera Saath", Wapas, "Je Hum Tum Chori Se" Dharti Kahe Pukar Ke, 1969. "O Ghata Sawari" and "Sa Re Ga Ma Pa" Abhinetri. In 1971, two songs from V Shantaram classic Jal Bin Machhli Nritya Bin Bijli  "O Mitwa O Mitwa","Kajara Laga Ke" and Mukesh classic "Taron Na Sajkę"."Rook Jana Nahin" and "Roz Sham Aati Thi", Imtihan 1974.

He continued writing ever so youthful songs even for the next generation –  for Hussain’s son, Mansoor Khan, in the latter’s films like Qayamat Se Qayamat Tak (1988) and Jo Jeeta Wohi Sikander (1992).

Among the last films he wrote for was the Shah Rukh Khan starrer One 2 Ka 4 released after his death in 2001.

Political leanings
Film Shah Jehan (1946) was followed by S. Fazil's Mehndi,  Doli (1947), Mehboob's Andaz (1949) and Shaheed Latif's Arzoo. Just as Majrooh was establishing himself as a lyricist and songwriter of repute, his leftist leanings got him into trouble. The government wasn't amused by his anti-establishment poems and he was jailed in 1949 along with other leftists like Balraj Sahni. Majrooh's arrest took place during a nationwide arrest of communists after the 2nd Congress of the Communist Party of India in 1948, in which the communists had decided to carry out a revolution against the Indian government. Majrooh was asked to apologise, but he refused and was sentenced to two years in prison. While he was in prison, his eldest daughter was born. During this time his family experienced considerable financial difficulties. Raj Kapoor commissioned a song ("Ek Din Bik Jayega Maati Ke Mol") from Majrooh for his 1975 film Dharam Karam which he paid him Rs. 1000 for the song.

Majrooh's political beliefs were further manifested when his second daughter married the son of the Urdu writer and socialist Zoe Ansari.

Awards and recognitions 

Majrooh went on to write lyrics for popular films throughout the 1956s.  Along with Faiz Ahmed Faiz, Khumar Barabankvi Majrooh was considered the most notable ghazal writer. Majrooh won his only Filmfare Best Lyricist Award for the song "Chahunga Mein Tujhe Saanj Savere" from Dosti.
He was also awarded the Dadasaheb Phalke Award in 1993 and became the first lyricist to win the prestigious award.

Association with Nasir Hussain 
Majrooh and Nasir Hussain first collaborated on the 1957 film Paying Guest, which Nasir wrote. After Nasir turned director and later producer they went on to collaborate in several films, all of which had huge hits and are some of Majrooh's best remembered works:
 Tumsa Nahin Dekha (1957)
 Dil Deke Dekho (1959)
 Phir Wohi Dil Laya Hoon (1963)
 Teesri Manzil (1966)
 Baharon Ke Sapne (1967)
 Pyar Ka Mausam (1969)
 Caravan (1971) (includes the song "Piya Tu Ab To Aaja")
 Yaadon Ki Baraat (1973)
 Hum Kisise Kum Naheen (1977)
 Zamane Ko Dikhana Hai (1981)
 Qayamat Se Qayamat Tak (1988)
 Jo Jeeta Wohi Sikander (1992)
 Akele Hum Akele Tum (1995)

Majrooh also was instrumental in introducing R.D. Burman to Nasir Hussain for Teesri Manzil. The trio worked in seven of the above-mentioned films from 1966 to 1981. Burman went on to work in two more films subsequent to Zamane Ko Dikhana Hai.

Death 
Majrooh Sultanpuri had been suffering from lung disease for some time and had a severe attack of pneumonia and died in Mumbai on 24 May 2000. He was aged 80 at the time of his death. The Municipal Corporation of Sultanpur built a garden "Majrooh Sultanpuri Udyaan" in his memory near diwani chauraha. His son, Andaleb Sultanpuri, directed the 1999 film Jaanam Samjha Karo

Discography

References

External links

 
 Majrooh Sultanpuri at Kavita Kosh 
Majrooh Sultanpuri at rekhta.org

1919 births
2000 deaths
Urdu-language poets from India
Indian lyricists
Indian male songwriters
People from Sultanpur, Uttar Pradesh
Filmfare Awards winners
Dadasaheb Phalke Award recipients
20th-century Indian Muslims
20th-century Indian poets
Indian male poets
Poets from Uttar Pradesh
20th-century Indian male writers